Pentwyn Dynamos Football Club (Pentwyn Dynamos) is a football (soccer) club from Pentwyn, in Cardiff, the capital of Wales, whose first team play in the Cardiff & District League Premier Division. They have formerly played in the Welsh Football League and South Wales Senior League. The club has several teams including junior sides, recently which the U13's have acquired much needed funding by UK Cloud Backup provider Backup Everything.

History
The Club was founded in 1975 by Ray and Sue Seaward, where junior and senior teams were gradually formed. The club entered the Cardiff and District Sixth Division and by the 1980s a first and second team were established and playing competitive football. In 1989, Pentwyn Dynamos combined with Llanedeyrn AFC to ensure future progress of both teams.

Promotion to the South Wales Senior League was achieved in 1996, following successful seasons in the Cardiff & District League. Junior teams at the club continued to create a strong youth base for the club, securing league and challenge cup honours at various age groups on many occasions.

Pentwyn First Team were crowned South Wales Senior League Division One Champions at the end of the 2000–01 season, promotion meant Pentwyn would be a Welsh Football League team at the start of the 2001–02 season. The team has played within the Third and Second Divisions.

Promotion in the Welsh Football League divisions can be contingent on the quality of the club's pitch. A new pitch complete with stand was built next to the Pentwyn leisure centre; while this was being built, the club paid to use Leckwith Park. 

Club Secretary Malcolm Frazer has been with the club for over twenty-five years; from coaching young players of under 8's in the local leagues to helping run the first team: these long-term efforts won him recognition from local station Red Dragon FM radio.

Staff and board members

 Secretary:  Malcolm Frazer

External links
Club Official twitter account

References

Football clubs in Wales
Sport in Cardiff
1975 establishments in Wales
Welsh Football League clubs
South Wales Senior League clubs
Association football clubs established in 1975
Cardiff & District League clubs